Timothy J. Bartik (born March 26, 1954) is an American economist who specializes in regional economics, public finance, urban economics, labor economics, and labor demand policies. He is a senior economist at the W.E. Upjohn Institute for Employment Research in Kalamazoo, Michigan.

He developed a method of isolating local labor demand changes that is referred to as the Bartik instrument. This measure averages national employment growth across industries using local industry employment shares as weights to produce a measure of local labor demand that is unrelated to changes in local labor supply. This is a key tool in macroeconomic analysis.

Biography

Bartik earned a B.A. degree from Yale University (magna cum laude) in 1975 and M.S. and Ph.D. degrees from the University of Wisconsin-Madison in 1982.

Prior to joining the Upjohn Institute in 1989, Bartik was assistant professor of economics at Vanderbilt University (1982–1989), and legislative assistant for housing and urban policy for U.S. Senator Donald W. Riegle Jr. (1975–1978).

Bartik is also the son of groundbreaking computer programmer Jean Bartik.

Research

Bartik's research includes work in the following areas:
 wage subsidies and public service jobs to promote job creation
 state and local economic development policy
 early childhood programs as a means of economic development.
Bartik is also the creator of the "Panel Data on Incentives and Taxes database", a free online tool that offers the most comprehensive information available to date on incentives to business for economic development provided by state and local governments in the United States. Accompanying the database is a report (and detailed appendices) that explains how the database is constructed while offering preliminary analyses that begin to answer questions about how incentives vary.

Publications

Books
 Making Sense of Incentives: Taming Business Incentives to Promote Prosperity. Kalamazoo, Mich.: W.E. Upjohn Institute for Employment Research, 2019. .
 From Preschool to Prosperity: The Economic Payoff to Early Childhood Education. Kalamazoo, Mich.: W.E. Upjohn Institute for Employment Research, 2014. .
 Investing in Kids: Early Childhood Programs and Local Economic Development. Kalamazoo, Mich.: W.E. Upjohn Institute for Employment Research, 2011. .
 A Future of Good Jobs? America's Challenge in the Global Economy (co-edited with Susan N. Houseman). Kalamazoo, Mich.: W.E. Upjohn Institute for Employment Research, 2008. .
 Jobs for the Poor: Can Labor Demand Policy Help?. New York: Russell Sage Foundation, Kalamazoo, Mich.: W.E. Upjohn Institute for Employment Research, 2001. .
 Who Benefits from State and Local Economic Development Policies?. Kalamazoo, Mich.: W.E. Upjohn Institute for Employment Research, 1991. .

Other

Bartik has contributed over 30 chapters to various books, published over 30 papers in peer reviewed journals such as Growth & Change, Economic Development Quarterly, Journal of Regional Science, Journal of Urban Economics, and Challenge. He has also authored numerous working papers, reports, and presentations and delivered testimony to several legislative bodies.

Other activities

 (2008— ) National Advisory Board, Center on Local, State, and Urban Affairs, Gerald R. Ford School of Public Policy, University of Michigan
 (2003— ) Research affiliate, Rural Poverty Research Center, University of Missouri and Oregon State University
 (2001— ) Research affiliate, National Poverty Center, University of Michigan
 (2001— ) Co-editor, Economic Development Quarterly
 (2000—2008) School Board, Kalamazoo Public Schools (served as president 2005—2006)
 (1998— ) Editorial Board, Growth and Change
 (1992— ) Editorial Board, Regional Science Review
 (1991— ) Board of Associate Editors, Journal of Regional Science
 (1991— ) Editorial Board, Journal of Regional Studies

References

1954 births
Living people
Labor economists
American economics writers
American male non-fiction writers
Writers from Kalamazoo, Michigan
Yale University alumni
University of Wisconsin–Madison alumni
Economists from Michigan
21st-century American economists